Illuppaiyur is a village in Ariyalur district, Tamil Nadu, India. The village is near the river Kundaru. Illupai trees are found in abundance in this area; the village gets its name from this.

Mostly two communities reside here, Nadar and Chettiar. Illuppaiyur has more than five temples.

Demographics

As per census 2001, Illuppaiyur had a total population of 3231 with 1511 males and 1720 females.

References

Villages in Ariyalur district